The Peugeot 204 is a small family car produced by the French manufacturer Peugeot between 1965 and 1976.

The 204, known in development as Project D12, was available in many body styles including a sedan/saloon/berline, convertible/cabriolet, hatchback/coupe, estate/wagon, and a van. It was launched in Paris, France, on 23 April 1965 and became the best-selling car in France from 1969 to 1971.

Engine
The 204 used a front-wheel drive layout and was launched on 20 April 1965 with a single overhead cam 1130 cc petrol engine (the maximum allowed for the 6CV 'car tax' class in France). In September 1975, less than a year before production ceased, it received a more modern petrol engine, now of 1127 cc. Claimed maximum output, which at launch had been 53 bhp (39 kW), increased to 59 bhp (43 kW), though there was a marginal reduction in maximum torque.

Following the demise of the 204 the new 1127 cc engine found its way into a version of the Peugeot 304 estate: the smaller engine enjoyed substantial tax benefits in the home market when compared to the 1290 cc engines fitted to most 304s.

For certain export markets engine compression ratios and power on the petrol engines were reduced in order to accommodate lower octane fuels.

Towards the end of 1968 a 1255 cc diesel engine option became available for the 204 estate and fourgonette (van) versions. At the time, this is thought to have been the smallest diesel engine fitted in a commercially available car anywhere in the world. In April 1973 the diesel unit was increased in size to 1357 cc, and in September 1975 this diesel unit finally became an option on the 204 saloon. Out of the approximately 150,000 diesel 204s produced, fewer than 30,000 were saloons. Until the early 1980s when Volkswagen started heavy promotion of their diesel-engined Golf/Rabbit, cars too small to be used as taxis were generally not offered with diesel engines to European customers.

Layout and running gear

204 engines were aluminium and transversely mounted which increased available passenger space within a given wheelbase: the 204 was the first production Peugeot to feature this format which later would become normal for small and mid-sized front-wheel-drive European passenger cars.

The engine had a distinctive design; the gearbox and differential were located directly below the engine block. This design helped Peugeot produce its first front-wheel-drive car.

The 204 was also the first Peugeot to be equipped with disc brakes, albeit only on the front wheels.

The car proved to have good handling, decent performance, and excellent fuel economy.

The body

The compact engine and the transverse engine combined with a body wider than the class average to provide a level of interior space comparable to larger cars such as Peugeot's own 404:  both cars were Pininfarina designs. The 204 featured neither the fins of the 404 nor the sharp corners characteristic of the other major French launch of 1965, the Renault 16. The resulting less aggressive look has been seen as a 'more European' moving away from a tendency to follow US styling trends that had been apparent in new car launches during the preceding two decades. The Peugeot 204's frontal styling owes much to the 1961 Cadillac Jacqueline by Pininfarina, whilst its rear and that of the prototype Pininfarina styled Mini-based MG ADO 34 of 1964 are strikingly similar. The rear end of the 1970 Lancia Flavia Pininfarina Coupe of 1969–74 also displays the same influence.

The options list was not extensive but, as with the larger Peugeot saloons, it was possible to specify a sliding steel panel sunroof.

At launch only the four-door saloon version was offered, but the five-door 'break' station wagon (estate) came along less than six months later in the Autumn of 1965.  1966 saw the arrival of a two-door cabriolet and a three-door hatchback, marketed as a coupé. Both employed a shortened chassis and were priced only 20% above the level of the (admittedly not particularly aggressively priced) saloon. 
The range was completed in 1966 with the arrival of the 'fourgonnette' van version which in most respects followed the design of the estate, but with only one door on each side and a steel panel in place of the side windows behind the b pillar.

1969 saw the Autumn launch of the Peugeot 304 which was essentially a 204 with a slightly larger engine, a restyled front end and, in the case of the saloon version, a substantially increased rear overhang allowing greater luggage space. The 204 range was correspondingly pruned:  the 204 coupé and cabriolet received the dashboard of the new 304 in 1969 only to be withdrawn in 1970, replaced by similarly bodied 304 equivalents. The estate and fourgonnette continued to be offered, along with the saloon, until the 204 range was withdrawn in 1976.

Although the model run lasted more than a decade, the Peugeot 204 changed very little during that time:  very early saloons/berlines had a split rear bumper with numberplate set between the two-halves, a flat rear panel and small oval tail lights. For 1975, the stainless steel front grill was replaced by a black plastic grill of the same overall shape. The gearshaft for RHD UK cars was moved from the steering column to the floor.

Anglophone press reaction
The test car was priced by Peugeot in Britain at £903 including taxes: a British competitor, the Triumph 1300 was retailing for £835. The British domestic auto market still enjoyed significant tariff protection at this time. The journal commended the car for lively performance, positive accurate steering, fade free brakes, good fuel economy and light controls. Finish and equipment were described as 'austere and disappointing in relation to price', however.

Britain's MOTOR Magazine tested one of the rare 3-door 204 Coupé models on 12 October 1968.  In this case they found that the car would reach  on the MIRA banked circuit, with  being possible on flatter roads. 0–60 MPH was run in 17.3 seconds.  Overall fuel consumption was 30.2 MPG. The price including all taxes was £1299.  The car impressed the testers, despite its price, swollen by import taxes.

Commercial
When Peugeot 204 was launched in 1965, its competitors in French market were Renault 10 and the Simca 1300. Both were rear-wheel-drive while Renault was rear-engined. Citroën did not have any model in similar size to Peugeot 204, slotting in between its smaller Ami and larger DS until the introduction of GS in 1970. Panhard 24, Citroën's niche sub-brand, was built in a very small volume, too small to be a serious competitor for Peugeot 204.

The 204 represented a startling change for Peugeot when it was launched, joining the newly emerging trend of adopting the transverse-mounted engine and front-wheel-drive system for the mid-sized saloons rather than continue with rear-wheel-drive system. The BMC ADO16 (introduced in 1963) and Fiat-developed Autobianchi Primula (1964) had largely played the role in that direction. 204 was the same length as Renault 10 but 20 cm shorter than Simca 1300. The space utilisation and package advantage found in 204 forced Renault and Simca to switch to front-wheel-drive when updating their mid-sized cars (Renault 12 in 1970 and Simca 1100 in 1967).

The numerous press leaks following up to the official introduction led to the enthusiastic orders sight unseen of 5,000. The sales success of 204 pushed Peugeot from its fourth place to the second place in the French sales charts, overtaking Citroën and Simca in the process. Along with introduction of Peugeot 304 in 1969, Peugeot has redefined the domestic market for small and medium-sized saloons. 72 percent of the 204s built were delivered in France with West Germany being the next largest export market. In Africa, 204 didn't achieve the popularity of the sturdy 404 and its successor, the 504. The sales success of 204 and 304 helped Peugeot with profitability and gave Peugeot the means to absorb Citroën and Simca into its conglomerate when those companies suffered from the financial collapse of the 1970s.

When the 204 production ended in 1976, it had no direct replacement and was filled in by 304, along with its successor, 305 (introduced in 1977). In 1982 the 205 was launched as "204 successor" in market position and size, though the 205 was a smaller, hatchback car more akin to the earlier 104.

Competition
Operating somewhat in the shadow of the victorious 404 and 504, the 204 did not have an extensive competition history. It was campaigned with a measure of success, however, such as at the 1966 East African Safari Rally. Out of six cars entered, the 204s all finished and took the first six positions in the 1,101–1,300 cc class. The 204 also took part in the 1971 Tour de France, where it finished in 49th place in the 3GT class.

In June 1973, the Peugeot 204 Proto Diesel set eight endurance speed records in Category A3, Group 3. The record beating runs took place at the autodrome de Linas-Montlhéry, using drivers including Jean Todt and Hannu Mikkola.

Data

References

204
Subcompact cars
Coupés
Sedans
Pickup trucks
Vans
Front-wheel-drive vehicles
1970s cars
Cars introduced in 1965